The Galveston Seawall is a seawall in Galveston, Texas, that was built after the Galveston hurricane of 1900 for protection from future hurricanes. Construction began in September 1902, and the initial segment was completed on July 29, 1904.

Description 

Although the Seawall performed as intended, it created an unintended and insurmountable consequence: passive erosion resulting in the gradual disappearance of the once-wide beach and the resort business with it. "Within twenty years, the city had lost one hundred yards of sand. People who once watched auto racing on a wide beach were left with a narrow strip of sand at low tide and a gloomy vista of waves on rocks when the tide was high." Houston soon overtook Galveston as the major city in the region.

Reporting in the aftermath of the 1983 Hurricane Alicia, the Corps of Engineers estimated that $100 million in damage was avoided because of the seawall. On September 13, 2008, Hurricane Ike's large waves over-topped the seawall. As a result, a commission was established by the Texas governor to investigate preparing for and mitigating future disasters.

A proposal has been put forth to build an "Ike Dike", a massive levee system that would protect the Galveston Bay and the important industrial facilities that line the coast and the Houston Ship Channel from a future, potentially more destructive storm. The proposal has gained widespread support from a variety of business interests.  it is only at the conceptual stage. Further proposals for a layered network of smaller, local levees and natural protections have been put forward by the SSPEED Center at Rice University and the University of Houston. These proposals include a surge gate at the mouth of the Houston Ship Channel connecting adjacent high ground near the Hartman Bridge and hard protections for the west shore of Galveston Bay and around the densely developed east end of Galveston Island. Also included is the proposed lower coastal Lone Star Coastal National Recreation Area.

Texas F.M. 3005 is known as Seawall Boulevard where it runs along the seawall.

The seawall was listed in the National Register of Historic Places in 1977 and designated a National Historic Civil Engineering Landmark by the American Society of Civil Engineers in 2001.

Many miles of the seawall are painted with murals. These huge murals are painted by children and depict underwater life.

Gallery

See also

National Register of Historic Places listings in Galveston County, Texas

References

Further reading

 (Diagrams of the movable concrete mixer plant used for construction of the seawall)

 (Diagram and description of the geometry of the seawall to dissipate wave energy)

External links

One-hundred-year-old photos of the Galveston seawall

Seawalls
Tourist attractions in Galveston, Texas
National Register of Historic Places in Galveston County, Texas
Galveston Hurricane of 1900
Dikes in the United States
Historic Civil Engineering Landmarks
Buildings and structures in Galveston, Texas
Buildings and structures on the National Register of Historic Places in Texas